Old Station is a census-designated place (CDP) in Shasta County, California. It is located 13 miles (21 km) north of Lassen Volcanic National Park, directly between Redding and Susanville. The ZIP code in Old Station is 96071 and the area code 530. Its population is 64 as of the 2020 census, up from 51 from the 2010 census.

In 2021 the town was threatened by the Dixie Fire.

History and industries
Old Station was once a stagecoach stop on the trail from Sacramento to Yreka in 1857. It was also a temporary military post while soldiers patrolled the stage road.  Old Station also sits on an alternate route of the historic Nobles Emigrant Trail to California that was used by gold seekers around 1852.  It now has mostly traveler services including 1 gas station, 3 general stores, JJ's Cafe, and many campgrounds. It is the southern gateway to the Hat Creek Recreation Area. It is home to Subway Cave, the largest lava tube formed by the local lava eruption from vents near Old Station.  There is a two-mile Spatter Cone trail that leads from a United States Forest Service trailhead just off Highway 89/44.

Geography
According to the United States Census Bureau, the CDP covers an area of 2.2 square miles (5.8 km), 99.94% of it land and 0.06% of it water.

Climate
This region experiences warm (but not hot) and dry summers, with no average monthly temperatures above 71.6 °F.  According to the Köppen Climate Classification system, Old Station has a warm-summer Mediterranean climate, abbreviated "Csb" on climate maps.

Demographics
The 2010 United States Census reported that Old Station had a population of 51. The population density was 23.0 people per square mile (8.9/km). The racial makeup of Old Station was 49 (96.1%) White, 0 (0.0%) African American, 1 (2.0%) Native American, 0 (0.0%) Asian, 0 (0.0%) Pacific Islander, 0 (0.0%) from other races, and 1 (2.0%) from two or more races.  Hispanic or Latino of any race were 2 persons (3.9%).

The Census reported that 51 people (100% of the population) lived in households, 0 (0%) lived in non-institutionalized group quarters, and 0 (0%) were institutionalized.

There were 29 households, out of which 1 (3.4%) had children under the age of 18 living in them, 12 (41.4%) were opposite-sex married couples living together, 1 (3.4%) had a female householder with no husband present, 2 (6.9%) had a male householder with no wife present.  There were 1 (3.4%) unmarried opposite-sex partnerships, and 0 (0%) same-sex married couples or partnerships. 12 households (41.4%) were made up of individuals, and 5 (17.2%) had someone living alone who was 65 years of age or older. The average household size was 1.76.  There were 15 families (51.7% of all households); the average family size was 2.33.

The population was spread out, with 1 people (2.0%) under the age of 18, 1 people (2.0%) aged 18 to 24, 3 people (5.9%) aged 25 to 44, 27 people (52.9%) aged 45 to 64, and 19 people (37.3%) who were 65 years of age or older.  The median age was 61.9 years. For every 100 females, there were 131.8 males.  For every 100 females age 18 and over, there were 138.1 males.

The homeowner vacancy rate was 10.7%; the rental vacancy rate was 42.9%.  45 people (88.2% of the population) lived in owner-occupied housing units and 6 people (11.8%) lived in rental housing units.

Politics

References

Census-designated places in Shasta County, California
Census-designated places in California
1857 establishments in California
Populated places established in 1857